The English Mixed Doubles Curling Championship is the national mixed doubles curling championship for England. The championship usually decides which team of curlers is sent to the World Mixed Doubles Curling Championship later that season (if England qualified for Worlds). It has been held annually since 2008. It is organized by the English Curling Association.

Past champions

See also
English Men's Curling Championship
English Women's Curling Championship
English Mixed Curling Championship

References

Mixed Doubles

2008 establishments in England
Recurring sporting events established in 2008
National curling championships
Mixed doubles curling